Meximalva is a genus of flowering plants belonging to the family Malvaceae.

Its native range is Texas to Mexico.

Species
Species:

Meximalva filipes 
Meximalva venusta

References

Malveae
Malvaceae genera